A barm cake is a soft, round, flattish bread roll from North West England, traditionally leavened with barm.

Bacon is often the filling for a barm cake, at home or in Lancashire cafes or bakers. 

Chips are also a popular filling, sold in most fish and chip shops in the North West of England and often called a chip barm. Another popular filling in the North West, particularly Bolton, is a pasty barm.  In Wigan, a whole savoury pie is served in a barm cake, traditionally known locally as a Pie Barm or Slappy, and more recently as a "Wigan Kebab".

See also

Stottie cake
Chip butty

References

External links
 Youtube: Making Bread From Barm At Genesee Country Village
 Video on barm bread making in Tudor England - 1475
 BBC Radio 4 Interview - The ale-barm method: Worthy of revival or just barmy bread? 

Breads
British breads
English cuisine